Romántico (Romantic) is a studio album released by Mexican singer José José in 1981. José José performs classic boleros like "La gloria eres tú", "El reloj" and "Regálame esta noche". The album includes one new song: "Polvo enamorado".

Track listing
 El Reloj (Roberto Cantoral)
 Como Fue (Ernesto Duarte)
 Cancionero (Álvaro Carrillo)
 Reina Mía (Saulo Sedano)
 Regalame Esta Noche (Roberto Cantoral)
 Polvo Enamorado (Dr. Mauricio González De La Garza)
 La Gloria Eres Tú (José Antonio Méndez)
 Te Me Olvidas (Vicente Garrido)
 Novia Mía (José Antonio Méndez)
 Un Poco Más (Álvaro Carrillo)
 Muchachita (Mario Ruiz Armengol)
 Tu Ausencia (Alberto Elorza-Martha Rangel)

References

1981 albums
José José albums
Spanish-language albums